Julie Is Her Name, Volume II is an LP album by Julie London, released by Liberty Records on August 1, 1958, under catalog numbers LRP-3100 (monaural) and LST-7100 (stereophonic). The musical personnel on the recording include Howard Roberts on guitar and Red Mitchell on bass.

Track listing

The album was reissued, combined with the 1955 Julie London album Julie Is Her Name, in compact disc format, by EMI in 1992.

References

Liberty Records albums
1958 albums
Julie London albums
Albums produced by Bobby Troup